is a passenger railway station located in the city of Kuwana, Mie Prefecture, Japan, operated by the private railway operator Sangi Railway.

Lines
Nanawa Station is served by the Hokusei Line, and is located 6.9 kilometres from the terminus of the line at Nishi-Kuwana Station.

Layout
The station consists of a single unnumbered island platform connected to the station building by a level crossing. The station is unattended.

Platforms

Adjacent stations

History
Nanawa Station was opened on April 5, 1914 as a station on the Hokusei Railway, which became the Hokusei Electric Railway on June 27, 1934. Through a series of mergers, the line became part of the Kintetsu network by April 1, 1965. The Sangi Railway was spun out of Kintetsu as an independent company on April 1, 2003. A new station building was completed in 2005.

Passenger statistics
In fiscal 2019, the station was used by an average of 318 passengers daily (boarding passengers only).

Surrounding area
Kuwana City Nanawa District Civic Center
 Mie Prefectural Kuwana Technical High School

See also
List of railway stations in Japan

References

External links

Sangi Railway official home page

Railway stations in Japan opened in 1914
Railway stations in Mie Prefecture
Kuwana, Mie